Electric (KE) (formerly known as Karachi Electric Supply Company / Karachi Electric Supply Corporation Limited) is a Pakistani investor-owned utility company based in Karachi. K-Electric is a privately owned and vertically-integrated electricity distribution company

Timeline
In 1913, the Karachi Electric Supply Company (KESC) was formed to meet the power needs of a small port town called Karachi, incorporated under the now currently Companies Act, 2017.

In 1952, The Government of Pakistan nationalized KESC in order to facilitate the much needed investment in its infrastructure.

In 2005, KESC was privatized, with the government retaining a stake of approximately 26%, while 71% was transferred to a foreign consortium under the name of KES Power Limited.

In 2009, the new management, led by Abraaj Capital, took charge, beginning a turnaround story which has thus far seen investments of over US$2.1 billion.

In 2014, a low-cost power plant began operations, saving Pakistan hundreds of millions of dollars and cutting Pakistan's energy deficit. This power plant was funded by International Finance Corporation, a World Bank Group corporation. Since 1994, IFC has been one of the largest supporters of private power projects also known as 'Independent Power Producers (IPPs)' locally in Pakistan. This power plant increased power generation and improved energy supply for approximately 12 million people.

In 2014, KESC Changes Name to K-Electric and also changed its logo to three feathers of a partridge in orange, blue, and green representing energy, community, and environment respectively.

Shanghai Electric Power (SEP) entered into a Sale and Purchase Agreement (SPA) with K-Electric's holding company.

On 29 April 2019, K-Electric signed an agreement with the state-owned China Machinery Engineering Corporation (CMEC) to develop a new power project at Port Qasim, Karachi.

As of 2022, KES Power has a 66.40% stake in KE; while the Government of Pakistan's shareholding stands at 24.36%.

Energy Efficiency Day
K-Electric was a participant for the international Energy Efficiency Day, celebrated on 5 October, both in 2017 and 2018. KE won the best project award in the category of 'Corporate Solar Sustainability Program of the year' at the Middle East Solar Industry Association's (MESIA) Solar Awards 2018 as part of World Future Energy Summit held in Abu Dhabi.

See also 

 List of electric supply companies in Pakistan
 Electricity Sector in Pakistan

References

External links 
 K-Electric official website
 KESC name changed to KE
 KE participates in boxing championship Pakistan Today (newspaper)
 KE Women's Boxing Tournament The Express Tribune (newspaper)

Companies based in Karachi
Companies listed on the Pakistan Stock Exchange
Distribution companies of Pakistan
Energy companies established in 1913
Mergers and acquisitions of Pakistani companies
Pakistani subsidiaries of foreign companies
Formerly government-owned companies of Pakistan
2005 mergers and acquisitions
Indian companies established in 1913